Acres is an English surname. Notable people with the surname include:

Adam Acres (1878–1955), Canadian politician
Ava Acres (born 2005), American actress
Basil Acres (1926–2000), English footballer
Birt Acres (1854–1918), American photographer and film pioneer
Blake Acres (born 1995), Australian rules footballer
Dick Acres (1934–2012), American college basketball coach
Harry Acres, British film score composer
Isabella Acres (born 2001), American actress
Mark Acres (born 1962), American basketball player

Fictional characters:
Bob Acres, a character in The Rivals

See also
Acre (surname)

English-language surnames